Paul Latzke (born March 22, 1942) is a former American football center. He played for the San Diego Chargers from 1966 to 1968.

References

1942 births
Living people
American football centers
Pacific Tigers football players
San Diego Chargers players